Pablo Bouza (born 9 May 1973 in Rosario, Santa Fe, Argentina) is a rugby union former player and current coach who won 38 caps playing at No 8, flanker or lock for the Argentine rugby union side. He played club rugby in England with Leeds Carnegie (formerly Leeds Tykes), who played the 2007-08 season in the top-level Guinness Premiership after winning the National Division One title in 2006-07.

He made his international test debut at the age of 26 on 8 June 1996 against Uruguay in a 37–18 victory. He missed out on selection for the 1999 Rugby World Cup, but when selected for the 2003 Rugby World Cup he scored four tries in two games and was the only forward in the top ten try scorers. Bouza scored nine test tries in his 38 appearances for Argentina.

He played for Duendes Rugby Club in Rosario, Argentina where he was captain before moving to the English club NEC Harlequins in August 2005 in National Division One.  He made only five appearances for the Quins in their promotion winning season.

He joined Leeds Tykes for the National Division One 2006/07 season on a one-year deal. He was the Tykes 16th signing of the pre-season and he made his debut against London Welsh on 3 September 2006 at Headingley. He replaced Chris Murphy who had retired. He was the fifth Argentine international in Tykes colours after Octavio Bartolucci, Hernán Senillosa, Diego Albanese and Martín Schusterman.

Director of Rugby Stuart Lancaster said at the time: "Pablo is a vastly experienced international second row who will be a great addition to our squad for next season. I have spoken to Dean Richards, his coach last season, regarding his qualities and he has nothing but praise for him both for his ability and his attitude to the game. He will give us good strength in the second row and I am looking forward to having him in our group."

For the second straight year, Bouza was a member of the team that earned promotion to the Guinness Premiership.

Coaching
From 2013, he has been the assistant coach for the National senior side under head coach Daniel Hourcade.

References

External links
Leeds profile
Pablo Bouza profile

1973 births
Sportspeople from Rosario, Santa Fe
Argentine rugby union players
Living people
Rugby union flankers
Rugby union number eights
Rugby union locks
Harlequin F.C. players
Leeds Tykes players
Argentina international rugby union players
Argentine expatriate sportspeople in England
Argentine expatriate rugby union players
Expatriate rugby union players in England
Argentina international rugby sevens players
Male rugby sevens players